FAW Jilin (一汽吉林) is a subsidiary of the First Automobile Works and a maker of mini vehicles, small trucks and vans that see commercial use. It is located in Jilin City, Jilin province, China.

Founded in 1980, FAW purchased Jilin in 1987. Since October 2005, it was in a joint venture with Daihatsu Motor Co. of Japan, but this was dissolved in January 2010. Jilin retains production rights to the vehicles built and also retains the production facilities.

Models
Jilin originally built a licensed version of the 1976-1979 Suzuki Carry Wide (seventh generation), called the Jilin JL 110C/E. It was equipped with the same 797 cc four-cylinder F8A engine as used in the export version Carry ST80. Later, the  796 cc F8B was also made available. The JL 110E was a high-roof version of the van, and there was also a JL 110G, a long-wheelbase eight-seater version with the  970 cc F10A four-cylinder engine. The car was stretched by  just behind the front door, to allow for another row of seats. It was also  wider and could reach .

Most of Jilin's previous products are small vans and trucks based on the ninth generation Suzuki Carry (second generation Suzuki Every). After a series of reskins, most recently the CA6360 of 2003, not much of the Suzuki heritage besides the sliding doors remains visible. The 6-seater CA6350/6361, and the four-passenger pickup version CA 1016, first appeared in 1999. The CA1010, a regular pickup version, was shown in 2003. The more modern-looking 6- to 8-seat CA 6360 is equipped with the two more powerful engines (44 or 52 PS).

The larger, more modern yet AV6 CA6371 minivan debuted at the Shanghai Motor Show in August 2005. The streamlined 5-seat minivan CA6410 has also been listed as available since the late 1990s. The Daihatsu Xenia SUV has been built by Jilin as the Jilin-Senya M80 since 2007, and at the Beijing Auto Show in May 2010 the new Senya S80 (or Xenia) was introduced. The S80 features more body cladding and equipment, justifying a somewhat higher price. The FAW Xenia S80 was released in December 2010.

The Senya M80 was later discontinued and was replaced by the Senya R7 subcompact crossover launched on the Chinese car market in the first quarter of 2016 sharing platforms with the Besturn X40. From 2018, the Senya family changed its name to Senia. A larger Senia R9 compact crossover followed later and debuted on the 2018 Beijing Auto Show and was launched on the Chinese car market in May 2018.

Current Products
 Senia R7
 Senia R7 C
 Senia R8
 Senia R9
 Jiabao V52/V55
 Jiabao V75/V77
 Jiabao V80
 Jiabao T51 (Based on the Jiefang/Jiebao CA6360)
 Jiabao T50/T57 (Based on the V52/V55)
 Jiefang T80/T90 (Based on the Jiabao V80)

Discontinued Products
 Senya S80
 Senya M80
 Jiabao V70
 Jiefang CA6361

Production bases and facilities
FAW Jilin has at least one production base, and two more are planned.

References

External links
 FAW Jilin Automobile Co Ltd official site 
 FAW Jilin Xenia S80 Gallery
 FAW Jilin Xenia M80 Gallery

Truck manufacturers of China
Vehicle manufacturing companies established in 1980
FAW Group divisions and subsidiaries